La otra y yo is a 1949 Argentine comedy film directed by Antonio Momplet and starring Amelia Bence, Enrique Alvarez Diosdado, Fernando Lamas and Mercedes Simone.

References

External links

1949 films
Argentine comedy films
1949 comedy films
Films directed by Luis Saslavsky
Films based on works by Louis Verneuil
Argentine black-and-white films
1940s Argentine films